The 2010 Ontario Men's Curling Championship was held February 1-7th, 2010 at the Strathcona Paper Centre in Napanee.

Eleven teams participated. It marked the first year that the defending champion (Glenn Howard's rink) would get an automatic berth.

Winner Glenn Howard went on to represent Ontario at the 2010 Tim Hortons Brier in Halifax, Nova Scotia, losing in the final to Kevin Koe's Alberta rink.

Teams

Standings

Scores

Draw 1
February 1, 14:00

Draw 2
February 1, 19:15

Draw 3
February 2, 14:00

Draw 4
February 2, 19:00

Draw 5
February 3, 09:00

Draw 6
February 3, 14:00

Draw 7
February 3, 19:00

Draw 8
February 4, 14:00

Draw 9
February 4, 19:00

Draw 10
February 5, 14:00

Draw 11
February 5, 19:00

Playoffs

1 vs. 2
February 6, 1400

3 vs. 4
February 6, 1900

Semifinal
February 7, 930

Final
February 7, 1400

Zone playdowns
Teams entered by OCA Zone

Zone 1
December 11–13, Ottawa Curling Club
Charles Wert (Cornwall)
Brian Fleischhaker (Ottawa)
Gary Rowe (Ottawa)
Shane Latimer (Ottawa)
Kevin McConnell (Ottawa)
Brian Lewis (Ottawa)
Mathew Camm (Navan)

Zone 2
December 11–13, Ottawa Curling Club
J.P. Lachance (Rideau)
Bill Blad (Rideau)
Mark Leger (Rideau)
Daryl Smith (Rideau)
Tim March (Brockville)
Howard Rajala (Rideau)
Bryan Cochrane (Rideau)
Frank O'Driscoll (Rideau)
Greg Richardson (Rideau)

Zone 3
December 12–13, Arnprior Curling Club
Steve Allen (Arnprior)
Chris Gardner (Arnprior) 
Doug Johnston (Arnprior)
Damien Villard (Renfrew)
Bruce Delaney (Renfrew)
Steve Lodge (Renfrew)
Roch Cote (City View)

Zone 4
December 4–6, Land O'Lakes Curling Club, Tweed
Bryce Rowe (Land O'Lakes)
Dave Collyer (Quinte)
Sean Meleschuk (Royal Kingston)
Josh Adams (Stirling)
Paul Aitken (Trenton)
Christopher Ciasnocha (Trenton)
Scott Kerr (Trenton)
Greg Balsdon (Loonie)
Scott Buckley (Cataraqui) 
Jim Marshall (Land O'Lakes)
Paul Dickson (Napanee)
Dennis Murray (Quinte)

Zone 5
December 19–20, Beaverton Curling Club
Jake Speedie (Beaverton)
Wayne Warren (Cannington)
Kent Beddows (Cannington)
Dave Nigh (Lindsay)
Tyler Jones (Peterborough)
Norm McLaughlin (Peterborough)
Keith Furevick (Peterborough)
Bill Harrison (Woodville)

Zone 6
December 4–6, Annandale Country Club, Ajax
Jason March (Annandale)
Jeff Clark (Dalewood)
Bruce Jefferson (Uxbridge)
Rob Lobel (Whitby)
John Bell (Unionville)
Scott McPherson (Unionville)
Brian Studdard (Oshawa)

Zone 7
December 12–15 at the Toronto Cricket, Skating & Curling Club
Aiden Ritchie (East York)
Gregg Truscott (Scarboro)
Tim Morrison (Scarboro)
Dave Coutanche (Richmond Hill)
Dennis Moretto (Richmond Hill)
Peter Matthews (Richmond Hill)
Joe Frans (Thornhill)
Henrik Londen (Toronto Cricket)
Michael Shepherd (East York)
Darryl Prebble (Scarboro)
Duane Lindner (Richmond Hill)
Jeff Flanagan  (Toronto Cricket)

Zone 8
December 18–20, High Park Club

Paul Gareau (Oakville)
Ian Fleming (Royal Canadian)
Guy Racette (Royal Canadian)
Roy Arndt (High Park)
Colin McMichael (High Park)
Bill Duck (St. George's)
Gary Grant (Oakville)

Zone 9
December 4–5, Acton Curling Club

Peter Corner (Brampton)
Dayna Deruelle (Brampton)
Rob Lipsett (Markdale)
Steve Odsford (Milton)
Alex Foster (North Halton)
Tom Little (Shelburne)

Zone 10
December 19–20, South Muskoka Curling & Golf Club, Bracebridge

Rick Dafoe (Bradford)
Cory Heggestad (Stroud)
Andrew Thompson (Stroud)
Greg Bruce (Barrie)
Dale Matchett (Bradford)
G.W. King (Midland)

Zone 11
December 4–6, Tara Curling Club

Al Hutchinson (Blue Water)
Patrick Greenman (Meaford)
Patrick Armstrong (Port Elgin)
Joey Rettinger (Tara)
Al Corbeil (Collingwood)
Steve Gregg (Paisley)
Mark Bice (Tara)

Zone 12
December 4–6 Arthur & Area Curling Club

Frank Gowman (Galt)
Robert Rumfeldt (Guelph)
Andrew Fairfull (Guelph)
Jared Collie (Kitchener-Waterloo Granite)
Scott Buchan (Kitchener-Waterloo Granite)
Peter Mellor (Kitchener-Waterloo Granite)
Scott Lennox (Arthur)
Trevor Feil (Elora)
Ryan Sayer (Kitchener-Waterloo Granite)
Daryl Shane (Kitchener-Waterloo Granite)
Mark Kean (Westmount)

Zone 13
December 18–21, Glendale Golf & Country Club, Hamilton

Brent Palmer (Burlington)
Mike Rowe (Burlington)
Rick Thurston (Dundas Granite)
Todd Maslin (Dundas Granite)
Steve Henderson (Dundas Granite)
Ron Long (Dundas Granite)
Simon Ouellet (Glendale)
Garth Mitchell (Grimsby)
Matt Wilkinson (St. Catharines Golf)
Shane McCready (St. Catharines Golf)
Kris Blonski (Dundas)
Todd Brandwood (Glendale)
Joe Lococo (Niagara Falls)

Zone 14
December 4–6, Walkerton Golf & Country Club

Mike Nielsen (Walkerton)
Jake Higgs (Harriston)
Pat Ferris (Listowel)
Matt Mapletoft (Palmerston)

Zone 15
December 4–6, Tavistock Curling Club

Dale Kelly (Brant)
Jason Young (Brantford)
Terry Corbin (Woodstock)
Dave Vandenbroek (St. Thomas)
Gareth Parry (Brant)
Aaron Ward (Simcoe)

Zone 16
December 4–6, Glencoe & District Curling Club

Jerry Ferster (Chatham)
Robert Stafford (Chatham)
Bill Mitchell (Glencoe)
Kirk Ziola (Highland)
Dustin Kroeker (Ilderton)
Bob Ingram (Ridgetown)
Rob Pruliere (Sarnia)
Heath McCormick (Sarnia)
Perry Smyth (Chatham)
Andrew Willemsma (Kingsville)
John McColl (Glencoe)
Mike Pruliere (Sarnia)

Regional Playdowns

Challenge Round

Ontario Men's Curling Championship
Ontario Tankard